Aoyagi (written 青柳 lit. "green willow") is a Japanese surname. Notable people with the surname include:

Akiko Aoyagi (born 1950), Japanese-born American illustrator and recipe writer
, Japanese baseball player
, Japanese baseball player
, Japanese professional wrestler and karateka
, Japanese film director and producer
, Japanese actor and singer
, Japanese actress and singer
, Japanese actor
, Japanese baseball player
, Japanese literature scholar and voice actor
, Japanese engineer and developer of pulse oximetry
, Japanese professional wrestler
, Japanese television writer

See also
Aoyagi Station, a railway station in Chino, Nagano Prefecture, Japan
9886 Aoyagi, a main-belt asteroid

Japanese-language surnames